Coenodomus dudgeoni is a species of snout moth in the genus Coenodomus. It is known from Bhutan.

References

Moths described in 1896
Epipaschiinae